Regent University School of Law is the law school of Regent University, a private Christian university in Virginia Beach, Virginia. It was founded in 1986 and accredited by the American Bar Association in 1996.

Admissions statistics
For the entering class of 2022, the median LSAT score was 157 and the median undergraduate GPA was 3.63.

ABA national competition wins and moot court program
Moot court teams from the Regent University School of Law have placed as quarter-finalists or better in over 100 moot court competitions, winning more than 40 national and regional events. In 2006 and 2007, Regent Law won several national ABA moot court and negotiation competitions succeeding against teams from Harvard and Yale. Regent's moot court program was ranked sixth in the nation in 2015.

Notable People

Deans 
 Jeffrey A. Brauch (2000–2015)
 Michael V. Hernandez (2015–2019)
 Mark D. Martin (2019–2022)
 Bradley Lingo (2022–present)

Faculty 
 John D. Ashcroft
 Erin Hawley
 James Duane
 Supreme Court Justice Samuel Alito

Alumni 
 Bob McDonnell, graduated 1989
 Daniel Kelly, graduated 1991

References

Regent University
Law schools in Virginia
1986 establishments in Virginia